Wickus is both a given name and a surname. 

Notable people with the given name include:
Wickus Nienaber (born 1981), Swazi swimmer
Wickus van Vuuren (born 1989), South African cricketer

Notable people with the surname include:
Amy Wickus (born 1972), American middle-distance runner

Given names